Petr Uhl (8 October 1941 – 1 December 2021) was a Czech journalist, activist, and politician. A member of the Civic Forum, he served in the Federal Assembly of Czechoslovakia from 1990 to 1992. He was also a signatory of Charter 77.

References

External links
 Petr Uhl and the jailed Chartists in Czechoslovakia, International Marxist Group, 1980.

1941 births
2021 deaths
Charter 77 signatories
Chevaliers of the Légion d'honneur
Czech anti-communists
Czech Technical University in Prague alumni
Czechoslovak prisoners and detainees
Czechoslovak democracy activists
Czechoslovak dissidents
Civic Forum politicians
Journalists from Prague
Knights of the Ordre national du Mérite
People of the Velvet Revolution
Recipients of Medal of Merit (Czech Republic)